Amal Clooney (born 3 February 1978) is a Lebanese and British barrister. Her clients include Filipino and American journalist Maria Ressa; former President of the Maldives Mohamed Nasheed; Julian Assange, the founder of WikiLeaks; former Prime Minister of Ukraine Yulia Tymoshenko; Egyptian-born Canadian journalist Mohamed Fahmy; and Iraqi activist Nadia Murad.

She co-founded the Clooney Foundation for Justice with her husband, American actor, George Clooney.

Early life and family 
Amal Alamuddin Clooney was born in Beirut, Lebanon. Her first name is from أمل,  in Arabic, meaning "hope".

Her family left Lebanon when she was two years old, during the Lebanese Civil War, and settled in Gerrards Cross, Buckinghamshire.

Her father Ramzi Alamuddin, a Lebanese Druze from the Alam al-Din dynasty village of Baakline in the Chouf District, received his MBA degree at the American University of Beirut. He returned to Lebanon in 1991 after the end of the  civil war.

Her mother, Baria (née Miknass), was born to a family of Sunni Muslims in Tripoli in Northern Lebanon, and a Palestinian-Jordanian mother. She was a political journalist and foreign editor of the Saudi-run newspaper al-Hayat. She is a founder of the public relations company International Communication Experts, which is part of a larger company that specialises in celebrity guest bookings, publicity photography, and event promotion.

Amal has three siblings: one sister (Tala) and two half-brothers from her father's first marriage.

Amal attended Dr Challoner's High School, a girls' grammar school located in Little Chalfont, Buckinghamshire, prior to university. She then studied at St Hugh's College, Oxford, where she received an exhibition grant and the Shrigley Award. She graduated with a Bachelor of Arts (BA) degree in jurisprudence in 2000. The following year she entered New York University School of Law to study for the Master of Laws (LL.M) degree. She received the Jack J. Katz Memorial Award for excellence in entertainment law. While at NYU she worked for one semester in the office of Sonia Sotomayor, then a judge for the United States Court of Appeals for the Second Circuit and NYU Law faculty member.

Career 

Clooney is qualified to practice law in the United States, England, and Wales. She was admitted to the bar in New York in 2002, and called to the Bar of England and Wales in 2010. She has also practised at international courts in The Hague, including the International Court of Justice and the International Criminal Court.

Clooney worked at Sullivan & Cromwell in New York City for three years as part of the Criminal Defense and Investigations Group, where her clients included Enron and Arthur Andersen.

She completed a judicial clerkship at the International Court of Justice in 2004, serving under Judge Vladlen S. Vereshchetin from Russia, Judge Nabil Elaraby from Egypt, and ad hoc Judge Sir Franklin Berman from the United Kingdom.

She was subsequently based in The Hague working in the Office of the Prosecutor at the UN Special Tribunal for Lebanon and at the International Criminal Tribunal for the former Yugoslavia, where she was Judicial assistant to Judge Patrick Robinson, Presiding Judge. The case charged the former President of former Republic of Yugoslavia with crimes allegedly committed in Kosovo, Croatia, and Bosnia during the war in the former Yugoslavia.

In 2010, Clooney was called to the Bar of England & Wales, Inner Temple. She is a practising barrister at Doughty Street Chambers. Clooney is ranked in the legal directories Legal 500 and Chambers and Partners as a leading barrister in international human rights law, public international law, and international criminal law. She is described as 'a brilliant legal mind' who 'handles cases of real international importance' and 'knows her brief inside out'. She is said to be a 'natural lead advocate' who is 'tactically first class' and 'a rare combination of intellectual depth and pragmatism'. The directories also spotlight her 'superb advocacy' and 'commanding presence before courts' and describe her as 'a dream performer before international tribunals'. They also emphasize that she is 'fantastically innovative' with an ability to galvanize 'heads of state, foreign ministers and business ... in a way that is very effective' for victims of human rights abuses. She is described as 'unafraid to raise novel points of law', 'very sophisticated in pushing the boundaries' and having a 'passionate commitment to the law and compassion for the people it serves'.

Clooney represents clients before international courts including the International Criminal Court, the International Court of Justice and the European Court of Human Rights. She represents victims of mass atrocities, including genocide and sexual violence and is representing a group of Iraqi victims from the Yazidi community seeking accountability for genocide and other crimes perpetrated by ISIS, including Nobel Peace Prize Laurette, Nadia Murad. Clooney is also representing Yazidi victims in a landmark case, alleging complicity in crimes against humanity by a French company, Lafarge for allegedly funded ISIS to keep open a plant in northern Syria that operated between 2011 and 2014. In 2021, Clooney was co-plaintiff's and victims' counsel in the first case in which an ISIS member was convicted of genocide and sentenced to life in prison.

Clooney regularly represents journalists and is currently leading the international counsel team acting for Filipino journalist and CEO of the news website Rappler, Maria Ressa. Ressa faces a series of legal charges that could lead to about 100 years in prison. Ressa was awarded the Nobel Peace Prize in 2021 for her 'courageous fight for freedom of expression in the Philippines'. Clooney previously represented Wa Lone and Kyaw Soe Oo, two Reuters journalists from Myanmar who were sentenced to seven years in prison by the government for reporting on crimes committed against Rohingyas by the Myanmar forces. They were released in May 2019.

Since 2015, Clooney has been a visiting faculty member and a senior fellow of Columbia Law School's Human Rights Institute, where she co-teaches the Human Rights Course with Professor Sarah H. Cleveland. Clooney has also lectured students on international criminal law at the SOAS School of Law in London, The New School in New York City, The Hague Academy of International Law, and the University of North Carolina at Chapel Hill.

Appointments 

 Appointed as Special Adviser to the International Criminal Court Prosecutor, Karim Khan QC, on Darfur.
 Appointed to the UK Attorney General's Office Public International Law Panel (Panel C from 2014 to 2019 and Panel B from 2020), a panel of experts in international law called upon to advise and represent the UK in domestic and international courts.
 Appointed as UK Special Envoy on Media Freedom (2019–2020) by the UK Foreign Secretary (2019–2020).
 Appointed as Deputy Chair of the High Level Panel of Legal Experts on Media Freedom (2019–2021) by Lord Neuberger of Abbotsbury, former President of the UK Supreme Court.
 Member of Expert Panel of Preventing Sexual Violence Initiative (PSVI) formed by former UK Foreign Secretary William Hague to gather evidence of sexual crimes committed in conflict zones.
 In 2013 she was appointed to a number of United Nations commissions, including as adviser to Special Envoy Kofi Annan on Syria and as Counsel to the 2013 Drone Inquiry by UN human rights rapporteur Ben Emmerson QC into the use of drones in counter-terrorism operations.
 Appointed to the Human Dignity Trust Bar Panel, a small panel of barristers who act pro bono and provide advice on cases challenging discrimination against the LGBT community.

Awards and honours 
 Clooney was chosen as Barbara Walters' Most Fascinating Person of 2014. At the 2014 British Fashion Awards, she was shortlisted for Best British Style alongside David Beckham, Kate Moss, Keira Knightley and Emma Watson.
 2016 World Economic Forum Young Global Leader.
 2018 United Nations Correspondents Association Global Citizen of the Year Award.
 In 2019, Prince Charles launched the Amal Clooney Award to celebrate 'incredible young women'.
 The Simon Wiesenthal Center honoured Amal and George Clooney with its Humanitarian Award at its 2020 virtual gala.
 2020 Committee to Protect Journalists Gwen Ifill Award for "extraordinary and sustained achievement in the cause of press freedom".
 2021 Reporters Committee for Freedom of the Press' 'Freedom of the Press Award'.
 American Society of International Law 'Champion of the International Rule of Law' Award.
 In 2021, the National Underground Railroad Freedom Center's recognised Amal and George Clooney for their work in social justice and modern-day freedom efforts at the International Freedom Conductor Awards Gala.
2021, Fellow of The Society of Writers to Her Majesty's Signet (known as the WS Society)
2022, Time magazine, Woman of the Year.
2022, Article 3 Human Rights Global Treasure Award.

Philanthropy 
Clooney is the co-founder and co-president of the Clooney Foundation for Justice, which she co-founded with her husband George Clooney in 2016. Their goal is to wage justice to create a world where human rights are protected and no one is above the law. The organization gathers evidence of mass human rights abuses, provides free legal support to victims and works to ensure that perpetrators are held to account. CFJ now operates in more than 40 countries: investigating war crimes in Ukraine, monitoring sham trials targeting women and journalists, and fighting back against a global trend of authoritarianism that seeks to punish those who speak truth to power. Its latest initiative, Waging Justice for Women, uses strategic litigation to reform discriminatory laws and increase accountability for gender-based abuse.

She partnered with the Aurora Humanitarian Initiative in beginning the Amal Clooney Scholarship, which was created to send one female student from Lebanon to the United World College Dilijan each year, to enroll in a two-year International Baccalaureate (IB) programme.

Clooney and her husband sponsored a Yazidi student, Hazim Avdal, whom she met via her work with Nadia Murad as Avdal worked at Yazda. Avdal was attending the University of Chicago.

In 2017, the Clooney's awarded a $1 million grant to the Southern Poverty Law Center in Charlottesville, Virginia, to combat hate groups in America.

In 2018, following the Stoneman Douglas High School shooting, the Clooneys pledged $500,000 to the March for Our Lives and said they would be in attendance. They also donated $100,000 to the Young Center for Immigrant Children’s Rights, through the Clooney Foundation for Justice, to help migrant children who were separated from their families at the U.S.-Mexico border.

Amal and George Clooney donated $100,000 to three Lebanese charities, the Lebanese Red Cross, Impact Lebanon, and Baytna Baytak, who helped provide aid to those affected by the 2020 explosion in Beirut.

In 2020, the Clooney's donated $1 million to coronavirus relief efforts. This included money for the NHS to help provide assistance to frontline workers and to The Lebanese Food Bank which helps single mothers, the elderly and vulnerable people who cannot work right now due to the Covid-19 outbreak. The also made a donation to The Mill at Sonning Theatre, located close to their Berkshire home, which helped ensure its survival through the pandemic.

In 2022, Amal Clooney, along with Michelle Obama and Melinda French Gates, launched the 'Get Her There' campaign that seeks to catalyze educating and empowering teenage females.

Personal life 

Clooney holds dual Lebanese and British citizenship. She speaks English, French and Arabic.

She became engaged to actor George Clooney on 28 April 2014. They had first met through a mutual friend in July 2013. On 7 August 2014, the couple obtained marriage licences in the Royal Borough of Kensington and Chelsea in London. They married on 27 September 2014 in Venice's city hall (at Ca' Farsetti), following a high-profile wedding ceremony two days earlier, also in Venice. They were married by Clooney's friend Walter Veltroni, former mayor of Rome. The wedding was widely reported in the media. In October 2014, it was announced that the Clooneys had bought the Mill House on an island in the River Thames at Sonning Eye in England at a cost of around £10 million.

In February 2017, it was reported by the CBS talk show The Talk that Clooney was pregnant. Friend Matt Damon confirmed the pregnancy to Entertainment Tonight. In June 2017, she gave birth to fraternal twins, a boy and a girl.

Works and publications

Books
 Special Tribunal for Lebanon: Law and Practice, co-edited with D. Tolbert and N. Jurdi (Oxford University Press, 2014).
 
 Co-editor with D. Neuberger of Free Speech in International Law (2022)

Book chapters and journal articles
 "Human Rights", chapter in I. Roberts (ed.), Satow's Diplomatic Practice (7th Edition, Oxford University Press, 2017) (update for 2022 edition in progress).
 "The Right to Insult in International Law?", with P. Webb, in Columbia Human Rights Law Review, 2017, Vol. 48, No. 2.

Selected articles and blogs
 Clooney, Amal (29 July 2021). "Don't Let the Autocrats Win – How Biden Can Use the Democracy Summit to Build Back Media Freedom". Just Security.
 Clooney, Amal (17 May 2021). "Yazidis Deserve Justice for Genocide: How Biden's Team Can Lead the Way". Just Security.
 Clooney, Amal (11 May 2021). "An ISIS torturer was complicit in genocide. The U.S. is making it hard to bring her to justice". The Washington Post.
 Clooney, Amal (12 June 2020). "A test for democracy in the Philippines". The Washington Post.
 Clooney, Amal (22 September 2017). "Finally, We Have a Coordinated Effort to Bring ISIS to Justice". Huffington Post.
 Clooney, Amal (14 October 2015). "Maldives Backslides Into Repression as the World Calls for President Nasheed's Release". Huffington Post.
 Clooney, Amal (2 August 2015). "It Is Time for Sisi to Set Al Jazeera Journalist Mohamed Fahmy Free". Huffington Post.
 
 Clooney, Amal (26 February 2015). ""Egypt Should Send Canadian Journalist Mohamed Fahmy Home". Huffington Post.

See also

References

External links 

 Amal Clooney at Doughty Street Chambers
 
 

1978 births
21st-century British lawyers
21st-century British women writers
21st-century Lebanese lawyers
21st-century Lebanese women writers
21st-century women lawyers
Alumni of St Hugh's College, Oxford
British barristers
British expatriates in the United States
British humanitarians
British legal writers
British women lawyers
Columbia Law School faculty
Criminal defense lawyers
Lebanese Druze
Gun control advocates
Human rights lawyers
International criminal law scholars
International law scholars
Lebanese emigrants to the United Kingdom
Lebanese expatriates in the United States
Living people
Members of the Inner Temple
New York (state) lawyers
New York University School of Law alumni
People educated at Dr Challoner's High School
People from Gerrards Cross
Sullivan & Cromwell people
Women legal scholars
Writers from Beirut
Writers from Buckinghamshire
Writers from London